Sonia Basso (born July 30, 1954) from Asiago is a former Italian cross-country skier and long-distance runner.

Selected results 
 1977: 1st, Italian women's championships of cross-country skiing, 10 km
 1979: 1st, Italian women's championships of cross-country skiing, 10 km
 1980: 3rd, Italian women's championships of cross-country skiing, 10 km
 1981: 2nd, Italian women's championships of cross-country skiing, 20 km
 3rd, Italian women's championships of cross-country skiing, 10 km

References

External links
 

1954 births
Living people
Italian female cross-country skiers
Italian female mountain runners